WSJL (88.1 FM) is a radio station licensed to serve Bessemer, Alabama. The station is owned by Elijah Radio, Inc. It airs a Christian talk radio format. WSJL is simulcast on WRHP in Anniston, Alabama.

The original construction permit for this radio station to serve Northport, Alabama was issued by the Federal Communications Commission on April 22, 2005. The station was assigned the WSJL call letters by the FCC on May 18, 2005. The station was granted a main studio waiver, thus allowing this station to be programmed entirely from a remote location with no presence in the city of license, on March 13, 2008. WSJL was granted its license to cover Northport by the FCC on May 9, 2008.

The FCC reports that the station fell silent on August 29, 2008.

On October 14, 2008, the station staff informed the FCC that there was "excessive undesirable noise in the audio output" and that the cause of this technical problem was undetermined. The station requested special temporary authority to remain off the air for 90 days to "investigate and repair the problem."  The FCC dismissed this application on February 9, 2009.

In early 2013, the station was sold by original licensee Mary V. Harris Foundation to Elijah Radio, Inc. The sale was consummated on January 28, 2013. The station's city of license was moved to Bessemer, Alabama effective August 13, 2013.

References

External links
 
 

Radio stations established in 2006
SJL
Talk radio stations in the United States
Jefferson County, Alabama